Market Arcade is a city centre Victorian shopping arcade in Newport, Wales. It also serves as a pedestrian route between High Street and Newport Market.

It is the second oldest Victorian arcade still in operation in Wales, the oldest in Newport, and one of the oldest in the UK.

History 
The Arcade opened in 1869 when it opened as Fennell's Arcade. It became known as Flowers Arcade in the early 20th century, reflecting the businesses that were present. In the 2000s, prior to renovation, the arcade was unlit, in structural decline, and it was the site of regular anti-social behaviour and damage. In November 2020 a public space protection order was put in place to enable police to restrict access at certain times, and issue fines of up to £1,000.

Renovation 
Newport City Council obtained National Lottery Heritage funding in 2018 for a £1.1 million renovation of the Arcade. The project was awarded to contractors Anthony A Davies and heritage architects Davies Sutton. The renovation was affected by the COVID-19 outbreak which pushed back work by contractors Anthony A. Davies until June 2020. It began a phased reopening throughout 2021, first with weekday openings and European Heritage Days tours taking place for local schools and community groups. Exterior scaffolding was removed in December 2021 and a completion date was set for January 2022.

Occupants 

The Arcade consists of a number of freeholds with separate owners. A number of buildings are leased to occupiers. It is currently set to open as a mix of offices, co-working spaces, and traditional retail units.

Gallery

References

See also
 Newport city centre
 Newport Market

Newport, Wales
Culture in Newport, Wales
Food markets in the United Kingdom
Shopping in Newport, Wales
Grade II listed buildings in Newport, Wales
Retail markets in Wales
Commercial buildings completed in 1889
Tourist attractions in Newport, Wales
Landmarks in Newport, Wales
History of Newport, Wales
1860s establishments in Wales